Han Lash (born 1981) is an American composer of concert music who has taught at Yale School of Music, Mannes School of Music, and the Indiana University Jacobs School of Music.

Biography

Han Lash was born in Alfred, New York, USA on November 22, 1981. They began their studies in music during early childhood, and continued to pursue music throughout their education. Lash obtained a bachelor's degree in composition from the Eastman School of Music in 2004, a performance degree from the Cleveland Institute of Music in 2008, a PhD from Harvard University in 2010, and an Artist Diploma from the Yale School of Music in 2012.  Their primary teachers include Martin Bresnick, Bernard Rands, Julian Anderson, Steven Stucky, Augusta Read Thomas, and Robert Morris.

Lash was appointed to the composition faculty of the Yale School of Music in 2013. During the 2013-14 season, Lash served as Composer in Residence with the Alabama Symphony Orchestra, as well as being the Sound Investment Composer with the Los Angeles Chamber Orchestra. In 2016, Lash composed new works for pianist Lisa Moore and loadbang for a Portrait Concert at Columbia University's Miller Theatre. In 2017-2018, Lash's Piano Concerto No. 1 “In Pursuit of Flying” was given its premiere performances by Jeremy Denk and the Saint Paul Chamber Orchestra; the Atlantic Classical Orchestra debuted Facets of Motion for orchestra, and Music for Nine, Ringing was performed at the Music Academy of the West School and Festival. In 2018-2019, Paul Appleby and Natalia Katyukova gave the world premiere of Songs of Imagined Love, a song cycle commissioned by Carnegie Hall. Lash's chamber opera, Desire, premiered at Columbia's Miller Theatre in October, 2019. Lash is an accomplished harpist and often performs their own music on the harp. Their Concerto for piano and harp was premiered in November 2019 by the Naples Philharmonic,. In August 2020, Hub New Music premiered Lash's The Nature of Breaking, with Lash performing harp. And in November 2021, Lash premiered their double harp concerto, The Peril of Dreams, with the Seattle Symphony and its principal harpist Valerie Muzzolini. Michael Schell wrote: "Lash’s 45-minute work manages to avoid the clichés and sentimentality to which harp music often succumbs".

In 2022, Lash was appointed Associate Professor of Music in Composition at the Jacobs School of Music at Indiana University.

Lash's works have been commissioned by orchestras such as the Los Angeles Philharmonic, the Los Angeles Chamber Orchestra, the Alabama Symphony Orchestra, the American Composers Orchestra, the Minnesota Orchestra, and the Saint Paul Chamber Orchestra. Their chamber music has been commissioned and performed by the JACK Quartet, the Da Capo Chamber Players, the Arditti Quartet, the Jupiter Quartet, loadbang, and Hub New Music, among others. Their music has been presented in such venues as Carnegie Hall, the Walt Disney Concert Hall, (Le) Poisson Rouge, Tanglewood Music Center, Aspen Music Festival and School, the Great Lakes Chamber Music Festival, New York City Opera’s VOX, and the Art Institute of Chicago. 

Lash's awards and honors include a Fromm Foundation Commission, a fellowship from Yaddo Artist Colony, the Naumburg Prize, the ASCAP Morton Gould Young Composer Award, a Charles Ives Scholarship (2011) and Charles Ives Fellowship (2016) from the American Academy of Arts and Letters, the Barnard Rogers Prize, and the Bernard and Rose Sernoffsky Prize.

Lash's music is published by Schott.

Selected Works

Orchestral
Music for Loss
God Music Bug Music
Hush
Facets of Motion 
Forestallings
Double Concerto 
Fault Lines (flute concerto)
The Peril of Dreams

Chamber
Total Internal Reflection (string quartet)
Frayed (string quartet)
Four Still (string quartet)
Glockenliebe (three glockenspiels)
C (piano and vibraphone)
Filigree in Textile (harp and string quartet)
Octet: Selves (violin consort or string orchestra)
Folksongs (piccolo, percussion, harp)
Subtilior, Lamento (flute, clarinet, piano, percussion, violin, cello)
Friction, Pressure, Impact (cello and piano)
Three Movements for Horn Trio (violin, horn, piano)
The Nature of Breaking (harp and ensemble)
Leander and Hero (wind quintet)

Choral
Requiem Pro Avibus Mortuis (SATB choir plus alto and countertenor soloists)

Vocal/Dramatic

 Desire (chamber opera) 

Blood Rose (alto, countertenor, string quartet)
Stoned Prince (male vocalist/actor, trumpet, trombone, bass clarinet)
Violations (soprano, alto, countertenor, two pianos, two vibraphones, electronics)
Songs of Imagined Love (piano and voice)

Solo
Stalk (harp)
Etudes, book 1 (piano)
Secrets (trumpet and electronics)
Silvers (“loeboe”)

Notes

External links
 Han Lash's official website
Han Lash's page at Schott Music

American women classical composers
American classical composers
Eastman School of Music alumni
1981 births
Living people
Harvard University alumni
Cleveland Institute of Music alumni
21st-century American composers
21st-century American women musicians
People from Alfred, New York
Yale School of Music alumni
Classical musicians from New York (state)
21st-century women composers